Winchester Magnum refers to a "family" of cartridges developed by the Winchester Repeating Arms Company, one of the oldest firearms manufacturers in the United States, in the late 1950s and early 1960s, all based on the same basic cartridge case.  The basic case was a "short" magnum, meaning it would work through a standard (i.e.; .30-06) length rifle action rather than requiring the longer, magnum (i.e. .375 Holland & Holland) actions.

Dimensions
The dimensions of the basic case are:

Originally known as a "short" magnum as compared to the .375 H&H Magnum, this is now considered the "long" magnum since the development of the family of Winchester Short Magnums. So today you would consider the .300 Winchester Magnum to be a "long action" cartridge.

Cartridge list
The cartridges in this family are, in the order of development:
.458 Winchester Magnum (1956):  bullet
.338 Winchester Magnum (1958):  bullet
.264 Winchester Magnum (1959):  bullet
.300 Winchester Magnum (1963):  bullet

With the exception of the .264, all of these cartridges are still widely used.  The .458 has become the #1 cartridge for dangerous game in Africa, as well as a very popular round with Alaskan/Canadian bear guides.  The .338 is widely used for game ranging from elk and African plains game to dangerous game such as grizzly/brown bears and African lions.  The .300 is one of the most popular cartridges in the world, used for everything from deer to brown bears and seeing military use as a sniper calibre. It is the most popular round for hunting large Alaskan game, and is considered to be a true round for all North American game, including the kodiak bears.

See also
 Winchester Short Magnum
 Winchester Super Short Magnum
 6.8 Western, a Winchester-developed cartridge based on the .270 Winchester Short Magnum
 List of rifle cartridges

External links
 Winchester Guns

Winchester Magnum
Cartridge families